Resistance may refer to:

Arts, entertainment, and media

Comics
 Either of two similarly named but otherwise unrelated comic book series, both published by Wildstorm:
 Resistance (comics), based on the video game of the same title
 The Resistance (WildStorm), by Justin Gray, Jimmy Palmiotti, and Juan Santacruz
 The Resistance (AWA Studios), an AWA Studios comic book meta series
 Resistance: Book One, graphic novel series by Carla Jablonski with art by Leland Purvis and published by First Second Books

Fictional characters
Resistance (Star Wars), the primary protagonist organization in the Star Wars sequel trilogy
The Resistance, one of two factions in Ingress

Films
Resistance (1945 film), a 1945 French film
Resistance (1992 film), a 1992 Australian film
Resistance (2003 film), a 2003 war film, with Bill Paxton
Resistance (2011 film), a 2011 war film, with Michael Sheen
Resistance (2020 film), a 2020 war film, with Jesse Eisenberg
The Resistance (film), a 2011 Chinese war film
The Resistance Banker (2018), a Dutch drama film

Games
Resistance (video game series), a series of alternate history sci-fi shooters developed for Sony video game consoles
Resistance: Fall of Man, a Sony PlayStation 3 game
Resistance 2, sequel to Resistance: Fall of Man
Resistance 3, the third game in the main series
Resistance: Retribution, a Sony PlayStation Portable game
Resistance: Burning Skies, a Sony PlayStation Vita game
Operation Flashpoint: Resistance, expansion pack of video game Operation Flashpoint
"Resistance", a map of Call of Duty: Modern Warfare 3 multiplayer
The Resistance (game)

Literature
 Resistance (Sheers novel), a 2007 alternative history novel by Owen Sheers
 Resistance (Star Trek), a Star Trek: The Next Generation novel set after Star Trek: Nemesis
 Resistance: The Underground War in Europe, 1939-1945, a 2022 book by Halik Kochanski
 Resistance, a 1995 novel by Anita Shreve
 The Resistance (Applegate novel), an Animorphs book

Music

Groups and labels
Resistance Records, a white power music label

Albums
Resistance (Burning Spear album), 1986 album
Resistance (EP), a 2002 EP by Mika Nakashima
Resistance (Alove for Enemies album), 2006 album
The Resistance (Muse album), 2009 album
Resistance (The Casualties album), a 2012 album by New York street punk band The Casualties
Resistance (Winds of Plague album), a 2013 album by American deathcore band Winds of Plague
Resistance (IQ Album), 2019 album

Songs
"Resistance" (song), a 2010 song by English alternative rock band Muse
"Resistance", a song by Japanese band High and Mighty Color
"Resistance", a song by Soulfly from Enslaved
"La Resistance" (South Park song) a song from the musical South Park: Bigger, Longer & Uncut
The Resistance, song by rock band Anberlin on New Surrender

Television

Series
Resistance (TV series), a 2014 French television period drama
Star Wars Resistance, a 2018 American animated television show about the namesake military organization
Resistance (miniseries), a 2019 Irish TV miniseries

Episodes
"Resistance" (Battlestar Galactica), a Battlestar Galactica episode
"Resistance" (Star Trek: Voyager episode), the 28th episode of Star Trek: Voyager

Other arts, entertainment, and media
Resistance (Doctor Who audio), a Dr Who audio presentation
Resistance: Journal of the Earth Liberation Movement, an earth liberation magazine

Politics and military
 Resistance (YBNP), from 2011, new name of Young BNP (ages 18–30), a political youth organization
 HMS Resistance, the name of four ships of the Royal Navy, and one planned one
 Resistance during World War II
 French Resistance
 German resistance to Nazism
 Italian resistance movement
 Korean Resistance
 Polish resistance movement in World War II
 Resistance movement, an organized effort to oppose a legally established government or an occupying power
 Civil resistance
 Draft evasion, also draft resistance, organized or personal opposition to military conscription
 Nonviolent resistance
 Resistance through culture
 Resistance: Young Socialist Alliance, an Australian Marxist organisation
 White Aryan Resistance
 The Resistance (American political movement), a movement protesting the presidency of Donald Trump

Science and healthcare

Botany and horticulture
Disease resistance in fruit and vegetables
Pesticide resistance
Plant disease resistance

Ecology
Resistance (ecology)

Healthcare

Disease resistance, the ability of an organism to resist diseases it is susceptible to
Airway resistance, a concept in respiratory physiology
Antibiotic resistance, used for bacteria resistant to antibiotics
Drug resistance, the reduction in effectiveness of a drug
Psychological resistance, the forces that counteract progress in psychoanalysis and psychotherapy
Response based therapy, counselling involving discussion of victims' acts of resistance to violence

Physics
Electrical resistance, the measure of the degree to which a conductor opposes an electric current through that conductor
Friction
Drag (physics) ("air resistance"), fluid or gas forces opposing motion and flow
Geological resistance, a measure of how well minerals resist erosive factors
Hydraulic conductivity, the ease with which water can move through pore spaces or fractures in soil or rock
Hardness, in materials science
Thermal shock resistance, a measure of resistance of a material to temperature jumps.
Thermal resistance, a measure of difficulty of heat transfer through a substance
Thermal conductivity, how well heat is conducted through a substance
Thermal resistance in electronics, heat considerations in electronics design

Other uses
Resistance (creativity), a concept created by author Steven Pressfield illustrating a purported mythical universal force he claims acts against human creativity
La Résistance (professional wrestling)
Resistance welding, a group of welding processes
Support and resistance, concepts in the technical analysis of securities in finance

See also
 Resistants, a fictional supervillain group appearing in American comic books published by Marvel Comics

Physics articles needing expert attention